Bruchia sparsa is a species of beetle found in the family Chrysomelidae. It is found in South America.

References 

Cassidinae
Beetles described in 1906